Taekwando at the 2013 Islamic Solidarity Games is held in  Sriwijaya Promotion, Palembang, Indonesia from 28 September to 1 October 2013.

Medalists

Poomsae

Men's kyorugi

Women's kyorugi

Medal table

References

Official Results

External links
2013 South Sumatera

2013 Islamic Solidarity Games
Islamic Solidarity Games
2013